"I'm Left, You're Right, She's Gone" (sometimes called "You're Right, I'm Left, She's Gone") is a song written by Bill Taylor and Stan Kesler and originally recorded by Elvis Presley for Sun Records.

Released as a single in April 1955 (with "Baby Let's Play House" on the opposite side), the song made it into the top 10 of U.S. Billboards C&W Best Sellers in Stores chart.

Composition 
The song was written by Bill Taylor and Stan Kesler, members of a Sun Records band called Snearly Ranch Boys.

Recording 
The commercial (released) version was recorded by Elvis in February–March 1955 at Sun Records' Studio in Memphis. The recording features Elvis on acoustic guitar and his regular sidemen Scotty Moore on electric guitar and Bill Black on bass. Both are credited on the record's label (as Scotty & Bill). According to Songfacts, the drummer's name was Jimmie Lott and he was "brought in" for this recording by Sam Phillips.

Description and critical analysis 
The song's lyrics deal with a heartbreak, but in a humorous way. The singer says to his friend that the friend was right in warning him that the girl would break his heart. But the singer still had to find out for himself if she was "the one" for him.

According to Susan M. Doll in her book Understanding Elvis, the song "features a common characteristic of country music — the passive acceptance of the singer's fate and the subsequent melancholy it brings," as the person who sings the song "passively resigns himself to the fact" that his girl is gone.

Musically, it is a rockabilly ballad. Originally Elvis Presley recorded it in a blues arrangement, but the version that was released was "something of a novelty", which "was more in line with the commercial considerations of the day".

Mike Eder in his Elvis Music FAQ finds the recording too polished and too similar to other Elvis' songs of that time:

At about the one-minute mark, the song features Elvis' "trademark hiccup vocal break".

Track listing

Charts

Other recordings
Jerry Lee Lewis, Hayden Thompson, Billy Joe Royal, Billy Fury, Billy Swan, Tom Jones, and Teddy Thompson have also recorded the song.

References

External links 
 
 "I'm Left, You're Right, She's Gone" on the Elvis Presley official website

1955 songs
1955 singles
Elvis Presley songs
Songs written by Stan Kesler